Oriang Hydroelectric Power Station is a proposed  hydroelectric power station in Uganda.

Location
The power station would be located on the Nile River, downstream of Karuma Hydroelectric Power Station, but upstream of Murchison Falls. This location is in Nwoya District, in the Northern Region of Uganda, close to the location where Oriang Stream enters the Victoria Nile.

Overview
In 2009, the government of Uganda commissioned a study, titled Project for Master Plan Study on Hydropower Development in the Republic of Uganda, that was conducted by Electric Power Development Company Limited and Nippon Koei Company Limited, and was funded by the Japan International Cooperation Agency (JICA). In the report of that study, published in 2011, three large hydroelectric power stations were identified for immediate development, in the 2013 to 2023 time-frame, namely Isimba Hydroelectric Power Station, Karuma Hydroelectric Power Station and Ayago Hydroelectric Power Station. Two other stations were identified for development in the medium term, after the first three, namely Oriang Power Station (400 megawatts), and Kiba Power Station (295 megawatts).

Timetable
The development of Oriang Power Station is in progress. In 2013, The EastAfrican newspaper reported that this power station was in the process of being prepared for tendering. Construction is anticipated to begin in 2020, and last approximately five years.

Other considerations
The JICA report outlined a possible phased approach, where the power station is built over a number of years and commissioned in phases, to conserve resources and avoid building over-capacity.

See also
 Ayago Hydroelectric Power Station
 Kiba Hydroelectric Power Station
 Isimba Hydroelectric Power Station
 Karuma Hydroelectric Power Station

References

External links
 Government power projects face dark future as Energy Fund dries up As of 8 June 2017.

Hydroelectric power stations in Uganda
Nwoya District
Northern Region, Uganda
Proposed hydroelectric power stations
Proposed renewable energy power stations in Uganda